The Woman's Club of New Smyrna is a historic woman's club in New Smyrna Beach, Florida, United States. It is located at 403 Magnolia Street. On May 11, 1989, it was added to the U.S. National Register of Historic Places.

See also
List of Registered Historic Woman's Clubhouses in Florida

References

External links

 Volusia County listings at National Register of Historic Places
 Florida's Office of Cultural and Historical Programs
 Volusia County listings
 Woman's Club of New Smyrna

Gallery

National Register of Historic Places in Volusia County, Florida
Women's clubs in Florida
Women's club buildings in Florida
Buildings and structures in New Smyrna Beach, Florida